Pelican State Beach is a designated California State Beach located in Del Norte County, California. It is also the northern terminus of the California Coastal Trail.

The beach is popular for walking and beachcombing along the beautiful ocean views. Because of its remote location and easy-to-miss access road, it has been described as "the loneliest beach in California".

At five acres, this sandy beach contains grassy dunes and driftwood. There are no facilities, but parking is available. Climate can vary substantially between seasons, from cool, rainy winters to very sunny fall and spring.

See also
 List of beaches in California

References

California State Reserves
California State Beaches
State parks of California
Parks in Del Norte County, California
Beaches of Del Norte County, California
Beaches of Northern California